The 2019–20 Dhaka Premier Division Cricket League was an edition of the Dhaka Premier Division Cricket League, a List A cricket competition that was held in Bangladesh. It was the seventh edition of the tournament with List A status, although almost 35 seasons have been played before achieving the status. The tournament started on 15 March 2020, and was scheduled to finish on 8 May 2020 Ahead of the tournament, a total of 137 players were transferred. Abahani Limited were the defending champions.

Despite the COVID-19 pandemic, the tournament started as planned. However, after the conclusion of matches played on 15 and 16 March 2020, the Bangladesh Cricket Board (BCB) postponed all further matches until 31 March 2020 at the earliest due to the pandemic. The postponement was initially extended to 14 April 2020, with the tournament postponed indefinitely. At the end of May 2020, Nizamuddin Chowdhury, CEO of the BCB, said they were waiting on the government's advise on the resumption of cricket in the country. On 2 June 2020, the Cricket Committee of Dhaka Metropolis said that they had no issue in resuming the tournament.

In July 2020, the BCB looked at the possibility of restarting the tournament in September 2020, playing all the matches at two local hubs. In August 2020, the BCB's president Nazmul Hassan were also looking at a possible window ahead of the national team's then scheduled tour to Sri Lanka to complete the tournament. However, in September 2020, the international tour to Sri Lanka was postponed, after both boards could not agree on the quarantine requirements for the series. After the news of the international tour being cancelled, the BCB were again looking at the possibility of completing the domestic tournament. In October 2020, BCB director Khaled Mahmud confirmed that it would not be possible to finish the tournament in 2020. In March 2021, the tournament was abandoned and replaced by the 2021 Dhaka Premier Division Twenty20 Cricket League.

Teams
The following teams competed in the tournament:

 Abahani Limited
 Brothers Union
 Gazi Group Cricketers
 Khelaghar Samaj Kallyan Samity
 Legends of Rupganj
 Mohammedan Sporting Club
 Old DOHS Sports Club
 Partex Sporting Club
 Prime Bank Cricket Club
 Prime Doleshwar Sporting Club
 Sheikh Jamal Dhanmondi Club
 Shinepukur Cricket Club

Fixtures

Round robin

Round 1

Round 2

Round 3

References

External links
 Series home at ESPN Cricinfo

2019-20
Dhaka Premier Division Cricket League
2019 in Bangladeshi cricket
Bangladeshi cricket seasons from 2000–01
Dhaka Premier Division Cricket League
Dhaka Premier Division Cricket League, 2019-20